Elena Velevska (born 26 October 1980) is a Macedonian turbo-folk and popular music singer. Due to her dress and musical style, which resembles that of Ceca, as well as her strong presence in the yellow press of the successor states of Yugoslavia, she is at times called "the Macedonian Ceca". In 2007, she conducted a world tour, playing in front of large diaspora audiences.

In 2008, it was announced that she is expecting a baby and therefore is having a break from the music. She also married in beginning of the year in Ohrid.

Discography

Albums 
 Пу пу машала (Pu pu mashala)
 Говорот на телото (Govorot na teloto)
 Жена огнена (Žena ognena)

References

External links
 Official Website 
 Весна Миленковска: "Пејачка со глас, а не со става", Vest, June 26, 2002. 
 Весна Миленковска: "Кога ги масирам, како да се мои", Vest, May 5, 2007. 
 Весна Миленковска: "Елена Велевска на концерти во Швајцарија", Vest, March 1, 2006. 
"Zlatni noze!", Svet 455, March 9, 2006. 

1980 births
Macedonian pop singers
21st-century Macedonian women singers
Macedonian folk-pop singers
Living people
People from Prilep
Payner artists